Anthony Obiagboso Enukeme  (21 January 1944 - 9 June 2020) was a Nigerian businessman from Anambra State, south-eastern Nigeria. He was the founder, Chairman and Managing Director of Tonimas Nigeria Limited, a local manufacturing and trading company. He was a Papal Knights of St. Gregory recipient, and member of the Knights of St. John International (KSJI). He was also a member of the Board of Trustees of the APGA political party in Nigeria.

Early life and education 
Anthony Obiagboso Enukeme was born on 21 January 1944 to the Enukeme Family of Obiuno Umudioka Neni in Anaocha Local Government Area of Anambra State, along the Akwaeze roadside from Nkwo Market at Igbo Ukwu township. He was an only son, and had one sister. After his Primary school education, he underwent the Igbo Apprentice Scheme training for 15 years as a Petrol station attendant at Oturkpo, Benue State, and at Aba Ngwa market in Abia State. In 1975, he embarked on a further education drive that saw him complete both secondary and tertiary education in Public Administration by 1985. He then acquired a Masters Degree in International Affairs and Diplomacy, both from Abia State University, Uturu, Abia State. He was awarded an Honorary Doctorate Degree in Business Administration from Chukwuemeka Odumegwu Ojukwu University.

Business career 
Chief Enukeme founded Tonimas Nigeria Limited in 1981 and incorporated it as a limited liability company in 1982. The company markets and distributes refined petroleum products, manufactures aluminum roofing sheets and nails. He later diversified to hospitality, plastic manufacturing, tank farms, haulage, and shipping businesses.

Personal life

Marriage and children 
Chief Enukeme is happily married to Iyom Mary Uzoaku Enukeme (Iyom Mmiliaku) and the marriage is blessed with six children.

Death and afterwards 
He died on 9 June 2020 after a brief illness which was due to his inability to travel for routine medical checks caused by the COVID19 related lock-down in Nigeria.

Honours, decorations, awards and titles 
 Member of the National Board of Trustees of All Progressive Grand Alliance political party.
 President , Knights of Saint John's International (KSJI), Commandery 445, Aba, Abia State
 Grand President of the Owerri Grand Commandery
 Member of the Papal Knight, Order of Saint Gregory the Great(KSG)
 Vice Chairman of Awka Catholic Diocesan Pastoral Council of the Catholic Church
 President, Anambra State Council of Traditional Prime Ministers (Ndi Onowu)
 Former President, Aba Chamber of Commerce, Industry, Mines and Agriculture (ACCIMA)
 President of Lubricant Producers Association of Nigeria (LUPAN)
 Recipient - Merit Award on Business Excellence by the National Affairs Society of Nigeria
 Recipient - Merit Award on Business Productivity by the Institute of Corporate Chairmen of Nigeria
 Recipient - Golden Award from Saint Peter's Christian Fathers Association, Christ the King Church Cathedral Parish, Aba
 Recipient - Community Service Award by the Rotary Club International
 Recipient - Eminent Patriotic Merit Award by Pan-African and Philanthropic Organization
 Recipient - Distinguished Persons and Community Service Award by the Anambra Broadcasting Service (ABS), Awka

Community Titles 
 Community honors of Aku-Uvom 
 Community honors of Onowu Neni
 Community honors of Enyi Abia title by the Abia State Government
 Community honors of Ogbata Onuo Akwaeze
 Community honors of Anya-Anaocha from the traditional rulers' council of Anaocha local government area

Events 
Chief Enukeme built Saint James’ Catholic Church at Neni including a rectory, chapel, church hall, grotto of the Blessed Virgin Mary and handed it over to the Awka Diocese of the Catholic Church for a worship place. A requiem mass was held in his honor at the church after his death. He also built the St. Agatha Catholic Church, Umuarakpa, Aba.

References

External links
 https://www.tonimasgroup.com/

1944 births
2020 deaths
People from Anambra State
Abia State University alumni
Igbo politicians
21st-century Nigerian politicians
Deaths from the COVID-19 pandemic in Nigeria
Nigerian chairpersons of corporations
Igbo businesspeople